Marcel Mauron (25 March 1929 – 21 January 2022) was a Swiss footballer who played as a forward.

He represented the Switzerland national team in the 1954 FIFA World Cup. He also played for Young Fellows Juventus, FC La Chaux-de-Fonds, Servette, Neuchâtel Xamax, and FC Grenchen.

Mauron died on 21 January 2022, at the age of 92. His nephew, Yves, also played football.

References

1929 births
2022 deaths
Footballers from Geneva
Swiss men's footballers
Association football forwards
Switzerland international footballers
Swiss Super League players
1954 FIFA World Cup players
SC Young Fellows Juventus players
FC La Chaux-de-Fonds players
Servette FC players
Neuchâtel Xamax FCS players
FC Grenchen players
Swiss football managers
FC La Chaux-de-Fonds managers